The Fraser fir (Abies fraseri)  is a species of fir native to the Appalachian Mountains of the Southeastern United States.

Abies fraseri is closely related to Abies balsamea (balsam fir), of which it has occasionally been treated as a subspecies (as A. balsamea subsp. fraseri (Pursh) E.Murray) or a variety (as A. balsamea var. fraseri (Pursh) Spach).

Names

The species Abies fraseri is named after the Scottish botanist John Fraser (1750–1811), who made numerous botanical collections in the region. It is sometimes misspelled "Frasier," "Frazer" or "Frazier."

In the past, it was also sometimes known as "she-balsam" because resin could be "milked" from its bark blisters, in contrast to the "he balsam" (Picea rubens (red spruce)) which could not be milked. It has also occasionally been called balsam fir, inviting confusion with Abies balsamea (balsam fir).

Description

The crown is conical, with straight branches either horizontal or angled upward at 40° from the trunk; it is dense when the tree is young and more open in maturity. The bark is thin, smooth, grayish brown, and has numerous resinous blisters on juvenile trees, becoming fissured and scaly in maturity.

Their strong fragrance resembles turpentine.

The cones disintegrate when mature at 4–6 months old to release the winged seeds.

Some botanists regard the variety of Balsam fir named Abies balsamea var. phanerolepis as a natural hybrid with Fraser fir, denominated Abies × phanerolepis (Fernald) Liu.

Ecology

Reproduction and growth
Fraser fir is monoecious, meaning that both male and female cones (strobili) occur on the same tree. Cone buds usually open from mid-May to early June. Female cones are borne mostly in the top few feet of the crown and on the distal ends of branches. Male cones are borne below female cones, but mostly in the upper half of the crown. Seed production may begin when trees are 15 years old. Seeds germinate well on mineral soil, moss, peat, decaying stumps and logs, and even on detritus or litter that is sufficiently moist.

Distribution

It lives in acidic moist but well-drained sandy loam, and is usually mixed with Picea rubens (red spruce). Other trees it grows with include Tsuga caroliniana (Carolina hemlock), Betula alleghaniensis (yellow birch), Betula papyrifera (paper birch), and Acer saccharum (sugar maple). The climate is cool and moist, with short, cool summers and cold winters with heavy snowfall.

Pests
Abies fraseri is severely damaged by a non-native insect, the balsam woolly adelgid (Adelges piceae). The insect's introduction and spread led to a rapid decline in Fraser fir across its range, with over 80 percent of mature trees having been killed. The rapid regeneration of seedlings with lack of canopy has led to good regrowth of healthy young trees where the mature forests once stood. However, when these young trees get old enough for the bark to develop fissures, they may be attacked and killed by the adelgids as well.

For this reason, the future of the species is still uncertain, though the Mount Rogers (Virginia) population has largely evaded adelgid mortality. The decline of the Fraser fir in the southern Appalachians has contributed to loss of moss habitat which supports the spruce-fir moss spider.

By the late 1990s, the adelgid population was down. While two-thirds of adult trees had been killed by the 1980s, a study of the Great Smoky Mountains National Park showed that as of 2020, the number of adult trees had increased over the previous 30 years, with three times as many on Clingmans Dome.

Threats
The Fraser fir is an endangered species. Threats include climate change and balsam woolly adelgid.

Cultivation and uses
Although not important as a source of timber, the combination of dense natural pyramidal form, strong limbs, soft long-retained needles, dark blue-green color, pleasant scent and excellent shipping characteristics, has led to Fraser fir being widely used as a Christmas tree. Fraser fir has been used more times as the White House Christmas tree than any other tree.

The Christmas decoration trade is a multimillion-dollar business in the southern Appalachians. North Carolina produces the majority of Fraser fir Christmas trees. It requires from seven to ten years in the field to produce a  tree. In 2005, the North Carolina General Assembly passed legislation making the Fraser fir the official Christmas tree of North Carolina.

The Fraser fir is cultivated from seedlings in several northern states in the USA and across the border in adjacent parts of the Canadian province of Quebec, especially for the Christmas tree trade. It is also grown in Bedgebury National Pinetum and other collections in the United Kingdom.

See also
 Appalachian temperate rainforest
 Southern Appalachian spruce-fir forest

References

External links

Flora of North America: Abies fraseri treatment and range map—eFloras.org
Interactive Native Range Distribution Map: Abies fraseri 

Abies
Endangered flora of the United States
Endemic flora of the United States
Flora of the Appalachian Mountains
Natural history of the Great Smoky Mountains
Taxa named by Frederick Traugott Pursh
Trees of the Southeastern United States